Boys in the Band is a DVD that was included in a re-release of The Libertines' second self-titled album, The Libertines.

Track listing
Live footage
Factory
Moby Dick
Busking for Beer
Videos
"Can't Stand Me Now"
"Scenes from the Forum"
Photos
Photo Gallery
Extras
In the Van
Interviews
NME Awards
Credits

The Libertines video albums
2004 video albums
2004 live albums
Music video compilation albums
Live video albums
2004 compilation albums